Sadat Mahalleh (also Romanized as Sādāt Maḩalleh; also known as Sādāt Maḩalleh-ye Gelrūdbār) is a village in Baz Kia Gurab Rural District, in the Central District of Lahijan County, Gilan Province, Iran. At the 2006 census, its population was 198, in 56 families.

References 

Populated places in Lahijan County